Eighth Army may refer to:

 Eighth Route Army, a Chinese Communist unit that fought against the Japanese during World War II
 Eighth Army (France)
 8th Army (German Empire), a unit in World War I
 8th Army (Russian Empire), a unit in World War I
 8th Army (Wehrmacht), a German unit in World War II
 Eighth Army (Italy)
 Japanese Eighth Area Army
 Eighth Army (Ottoman Empire)
 8th Guards Army (Russia)
 8th Army (RSFSR), a unit of the Red Army during the Russian Civil War
 8th Army (Soviet Union)
 8th Guards Army (Soviet Union)
 Eighth Army (United Kingdom)
 Eighth United States Army